The Chitlin' Fooks were a duo consisting of Carol Van Dyk, the frontwoman of Dutch alternative rock band Bettie Serveert, and Pascal Deweze of Belgian pop group Sukilove. They released two albums, both on Hidden Agenda Records. The band they performed with consisted of four additional members: Guy van Nueten (piano), Pieter van Buyten (bass), Stoffel Verlackt (drums), and Helder Deploige (multiple instruments). Their albums have been reviewed by PopMatters, Pitchfork Media, and Robert Christgau.

Discography
Chitlin' Fooks – 2001
Did it Again – 2002

References

Dutch musical duos
Dutch pop music groups
Musical groups established in 2001
2001 establishments in the Netherlands
Parasol Records artists